Ofir Mizrachi (born December 4, 1993) is an Israeli footballer who plays as a forward for Liga Alef club Ironi Tiberias.

Career
Mizrahi born in Kiryat Motzkin, signed to Hapoel Haifa's youth system. After he didn't play, moved to F.C. Nesher, there he played 3 years and scored 81 goals. In summer 2011 he signed to Hapoel Ironi Kiryat Shmona.

On 25 November 2012 Mizrahi made his debut for the senior team against Bnei Yehuda Tel Aviv, and also scored his debut goal. 4 days later he made his UEFA Europa League debut in a 2–0 loss against Athletic Bilbao.

On 23 June 2016 loaned to Raiffeisen Super League club FC Lugano for one year for 25k € with option to purchase 75% for 300k € at the end of the season.

He made his debut at Israel U21 team on August 13, 2013, against Belgium, and in this game he also scored his debut goal.

Honours
 Hapoel Ironi Kiryat Shmona
Israel State Cup – 2013–14
Israel Super Cup – 2015

References

1993 births
Israeli Jews
Living people
Israeli footballers
Hapoel Ironi Kiryat Shmona F.C. players
FC Lugano players
Maccabi Haifa F.C. players
Maccabi Petah Tikva F.C. players
Sektzia Ness Ziona F.C. players
Hapoel Haifa F.C. players
Ironi Tiberias F.C. players
Israeli Premier League players
Swiss Super League players
Israeli expatriate footballers
Expatriate footballers in Switzerland
Israeli expatriate sportspeople in Switzerland
Israeli people of Iraqi-Jewish descent
Footballers from Kiryat Motzkin
Association football forwards
Israel under-21 international footballers